Teylan (Oyacık until 2014) is a village in the Kurtalan District of Siirt Province in Turkey. The village is populated by Kurds of the Pencenarî tribe and had a population of 375 in 2021.

References 

Kurdish settlements in Siirt Province
Villages in Kurtalan District